Lauren Gibbs (born March 2, 1984) is an American bobsledder who competes as a brakeman. She was named to the U.S. Olympic team for the 2018 Winter Olympics.

Career
Gibbs played volleyball while she was a student at Brown University. She left a job as a sales manager in 2013 to try out for the U.S. bobsled team. Gibbs won a bronze medal at the 2016 bobsled world championships, and with Elana Meyers Taylor won a silver medal in the two-woman event at the 2018 Winter Olympics.

References

External links

1984 births
Living people
American female bobsledders
Brown University alumni
Bobsledders at the 2018 Winter Olympics
Olympic silver medalists for the United States in bobsleigh
Medalists at the 2018 Winter Olympics
Sportspeople from Los Angeles
21st-century American women